The following is a list of maritime science fiction media.  Maritime science fiction is a subgenre of science fiction that is considered to have first appeared with Jules Verne's classic 1870 French language novel Twenty Thousand Leagues Under the Sea.

Literature
Verne's 1870 novel Twenty Thousand Leagues Under the Sea has been retold many ways in various media. Other major works of this subgenre in literature may include: 

The Deep Range by Arthur C. Clarke - 1953, 1957 as a full novel
The Kraken Wakes by John Wyndham – 1953
The Dragon in the Sea by Frank Herbert – 1956
Dolphin Island: A Story of the People of the Sea by Arthur C. Clarke
The Illuminatus! Trilogy - 1975
Aquarius Mission - 1978
Startide Rising by David Brin – 1983
Sphere by Michael Crichton – 1987
Reefsong by Carol Severance – 1991
Starfish by Peter Watts – 1999
The Trench - 1999 
The Scar by China Mieville – 2002
The Swarm by Frank Schätzing – 2004
Camouflage by Joe Haldeman – 2004

Television
 Voyage to the Bottom of the Sea (1964-1968) 
 Sealab 2020 (1972)
 Seaquest DSV (1993-1996)
 20,000 Leagues Under the Sea 1997.
 Sealab 2021 (2000-2005)
 The Deep (2010)

Film
 ‘’20,000 Leagues Under the Sea’’ (1954)
 The Atomic Submarine (1959)
 On the Beach (1959)
 Voyage to the Bottom of the Sea (1961)
 The Abyss (1989)
 DeepStar Six (1989)
 Leviathan (1989)
 Waterworld (1995)
 Deep Blue Sea (1999)
 Deep Sea Rising (1998)
 Underwater (2020)

Video Games
 Waterworld (video game) 
 X-COM: Terror from the Deep
 The Abyss: Incident at Europa
 Submarine Titans
 The Secret of the Nautilus
 BioShock
 BioShock 2
 BioShock Infinite: Burial at Sea

Toys
 Lego Aquazone

See also
 Nautical fiction

References

Further reading
Grünbein, Durs Die Bars von Atlantis Eine Erkundung in vierzehn Tauchgängen 
100 Maritime Science Fiction Writing Prompts by Knatia Parson

External links
Five fantastic nautical science fiction novels
Underwater Sci-Fi, Action, Adventure and Thriller Films
The Top 10 Underwater Science Fiction Books

1870 introductions
Nautical fiction
Science fiction books
Lists of science fiction films
Science fiction television series